Le Château des cœurs (The Castle of Hearts) is a féerie by Gustave Flaubert, published in 1880 in the journal La Vie moderne, under the editorship of Émile Bergerat.

References

1880 plays
French plays
Féeries
Works by Gustave Flaubert